Wrestling With Ghosts is an American television series about the paranormal that premiered as a web-series on June 30, 2017. Since then, the show's concept won the Destination America nationwide search for a new creative paranormal team. The show has since been picked up and is now being aired on the ASY TV According to the original introduction, season one follows a paranormal investigator, directly after he loses his original ghost hunting team to what he calls "a demonic attack" and subsequent fist-fight. He then hires three professional wrestlers as protection on future investigations. In 2021, the series started airing on the Intrigue Channel.

In 2019, Luke Walker and Vinnie Vineyard co-wrote a script for the movie The Hike based on their Episode 3.1 experiences trying to find Spearfinger in the Great Smoky Mountains coupled with a few of Vinnie's brother's amazing hiking stories. In 2020, production started on the movie, with Luke Walker directing, Vinnie Vineyard producing and editing, and the entire cast (including Kandi Thompson, and Travis Graves) starring in the lead roles.

Origins
Wrestling With Ghosts started when a paranormal investigator was eating at a restaurant in Gatlinburg, Tennessee. During the meal, he asked the manager on duty, Travis Graves, if there were any local ghost stories that would make for interesting television. Travis then referred him to a fellow employee, a long time resident, and former police officer Luke Walker. Walker had several stories and suggested than rather shooting one project in Gatlinburg for a documentary, that they should consider making a paranormal series. He then suggested that they should add entertainer Funkmaster V to the mix. The group then started shooting the series soon thereafter.

Cast and crew
The permanent members of the cast and crew are Big Luke Walker, Funkmaster V, and Travis Graves.
 Big Luke Walker, born June 4, 1975, is the executive producer, head writer and camera operator on the show, and is originally from Bolingbrook, Illinois. Walker is an ex-police officer (a fact the team lampoons in episode one: "I Used to be a Cop".) In fact, his first experience with the paranormal was while he was performing his police duties at the Greenbrier Restaurant in Gatlinburg, Tennessee. He is also an ex-swat team member, long time singer/ songwriter, professional wrestler, podcaster and amateur gemologist.
 Vinnie Vineyard (Funkmaster V), born December 20, 1974, is the director, editor and writer of the show. He is originally from Baltimore, Maryland and was a long time resident of Knoxville, Tennessee. Vineyard goes by his wrestling moniker "Funkmaster V" on the show, which he obtained from his musical career as a bass player. He has been an on-air disc jockey, stand up comedian, professional wrestler, podcaster, libertarian politician, bounty hunter, state champion judoka and owns a taxi cab company "Funkmaster V's Uptown Cabs of Renown" that is featured in the show. Funkmaster V has his own segment of the show called "De-Funked". This is where the team investigates a legend or claim and see if it holds water.
 Travis Graves, born August 4, 1989, as Travis Sagraves in West Palm Beach, Florida, is a camera operator on the show.
 Kandi Thompson is a singer who joined the cast in Season 3.

Guests and experts
 Mitchell Gore is a camera assistant who lives at a haunted location featured on episode 7.
 Kaitlin Shelton is a spirit medium. She is featured on a full segment on Episode 7 "The Furry Without a Fur Suit".
 Beth Gibson is the real-life girlfriend of Travis Graves. She is predominately featured on Episode 4 "Going Postal", when on her birthday, spirits seemed to follow her around, throw objects at her, moan at her, and slam doors behind her.
Perfect Pat is a wrestling promoter who knows the team from professional wrestling and was pivotal in allowing the team into Merrydeath Antiques, featured on episode 3 "Wee-Ji Want the Funk".
 Allan Miller is the docent of the Old La Follette Post Office and his retelling of local lore is featured on Episode 4 "Going Postal" and Episode 8, "The Postman Always Screams Twice".
 Hayley Stanley is a cosplayer that has helped the team when they needed someone to trigger misogynistic entities.
 Jenny Laurer helps the team on Episode 5 "The Giant Who Saved Gatlinburg" by putting a curse on the Mysterious Mansion and then reverses Funkmaster V's figure four leglock.
 Jeremy Cantelli is a camera operator who helped the team on segments of Episode 5, Episode 7, almost all of Episode 8, and all of Episode 6.
 Dalton Stout was a guest investigator on Episode 6 "The Rabbitman Cometh". He was the aggressive investigator that allegedly attacked other TV presenters during the famed "demonic attack" and this episode takes place at the same location of the incident. Eerily similarities ensue.
 Vito Thomselli of pro wrestling's The Thomaselli Brothers is the series narrator

Episode list
Season One
 Ep. 1.1- "I Used to Be a Cop" Greenbriar Restaurant in Gatlinburg, TN. Defunked at the Sensabaugh Tunnel in Kingsport, TN
 Ep. 1.2- "Chiroptera Surgit" Undisclosed ghost town in Western North Carolina Smoky Mountains
 Ep. 1.3- "Wee-Ji Want the Funk" Merrydeath Antiques in La Follette, TN. Defunked at a personal residence in Stearns, KY
 Ep. 1.4- "Going Postal" Old La Follette Post Office in La Follette, TN. Defunked at the Roaring Fork Motor Nature Trail in Gatlinburg, TN.
 Ep. 1.5- "The Giant the Saved Gatlinburg" Various Gatlinburg Locations. Defunked at Emert's Cove Cemetery in Pittman Center, TN
 Ep. 1.6- "The Rabbitman Cometh" Rabbitman cabin, Unicoi TN.
 Bonus Ep. 1- "The Furry Without a Fur Suit" The House of Gore in Bristol, VA.
 Bonus Ep. 2- "The Postman Always Screams Twice" Return to the Old La Follette Post Office in La Follette, TN
Season Two
 Ep. 2.1- "Drag Me to Jail" Brushy Mountain State Penitentiary in Petros, TN.
 Ep. 2.2- "One Fish, BOO! Fish" Vollmar's Park, Bowling Green, OH.
 Ep. 2.3- "They Died With Their Boos On" Bethesda Presbyterian Church, Morristown, TN.
 Ep. 2.4- "Be Ghoul to Your Schuel" Poasttown Elementary, Middleton, OH.
 Ep. 2.5- "Dark Side of the Moonshine" Sevier Distilling Company, Sevierville, TN.
 Ep. 2.6- "Haleraiser" Hales Bar Dam, Near the Tennessee/ Georgia line.
Season Three
 Ep. 3.1- "Spearfinger" Nolan Creek Trail, NC
 Ep. 3.2- "Indian Cave" Vonore, TN
 Ep. 3.3- "Horsefly Chronicles" Easton, PA
 Ep. 3.4- "The Causey Light" Nichols, SC
 Ep. 3.5- "The Devil's Cemetery" Green Sea, SC

Notable arete
Walker and Vineyard were among several citizens who helped save lives and properties during the Gatlinburg Fires of November 28, 2016. Walker's Facebook live broadcast was the first report that Gatlinburg's Ski Mountain was on fire. meaning the city of Gatlinburg was surrounded by fire on all sides. His footage and interviews, along with Vineyard's, have been used in documentaries. One entitled "Firestorm", is being funded by HBO and is in post-production. Vineyard, who owns the taxi cab company "Funkmaster V's Uptown Cabs of Renown", went into Gatlinburg to rescue people who were trapped or overcome with smoke. 
The exploits of their night and their tag team match for charity can be seen on the last two segments of Wrestling With Ghosts season one - episode 5, "The Giant That Saved Gatlinburg".

Controversies
On the 5th episode, "The Giant That Saved Gatlinburg", some members of the team allegedly tampered with evidence as a joke. Although the show is heavily comedic, the remaining members of the show did not think the joke was professional. Walker said on a radio interview on Parasearch UK "You fake one thing, you faked everything." Some members of the cast and crew were replaced after this episode.

In the world of pro wrestling, Walker and Vineyard have been outspoken critics of southern living, culture, and the overall way of life of native Tennesseans on YouTube with their "Punch Tha South In Da Mouth" series. But truth be told, they prefer living in East Tennessee over the big cities they hail from.

Awards and recognition
2016 winners of Destination America's Parasearch competition for brand new Paranormal Team

2018 Wrestling With Ghosts was the most illegally downloaded show in Gabon, Africa.

2021 ASY TV's 2020 Year End Award "Biggest and Funkiest of 2020"

See also
 List of reportedly haunted locations in the United States
 Paranormal television
 Truth Seekers

References

External links

  of Wrestling With Ghosts
  of ASY TV
 The Big Perm Show
 WBIR

Paranormal reality television series
2010s American reality television series
2017 American television series debuts